UMM is a Portuguese metal works factory and ex-automobile manufacturer based in Lisbon, Portugal. It was founded in 1977 with the purpose of manufacturing four-wheel drive vehicles for agricultural, industrial and utility applications.

History

The UMM 4x4 design is derived from a prototype created by the French engineering firm called SIMI. SIMI had produced the Cournil, a rugged two seater boxy looking Landrover type of vehicle made with Hotchkiss-JEEP parts with Ferguson Diesel tractor allwheel driven mechanicals itself was originally designed and built by mechanical engineer Bernard Cournil. A civilian model was called the SIMI Entrepreneur 4X4. The Cournil Entrepreneur's building rights were acquired in the 1970s by the Portuguese company União Metalo-Mecânica, part of the Mocar group and were renamed as UMM.

They became known for their durability, especially when in the Paris-Dakar rally the team was able to finish with all the cars that started. Many UMMs are still in use by utilities in Spain, Portugal, Cape Verde (in use by the national army) and France and also by the "Guarda Nacional Republicana" (Portuguese Gendarmerie), fire service and military, although the majority of their customers were private individuals. Around 700 UMMs are still in service in the Democratic Republic of the Congo (Zaire). They are also popular in France and Angola.

UMM stopped building the UMM Alter II for private customers in 1994, but kept on taking large orders from military and utility services until 1996. Custom orders are no longer accepted. It is suspected that more than 10,000 UMMs were made.

The most famous UMM is probably the one that transported Pope John Paul II in one of his visits to Portugal. It was based on a 1992 five door, long wheelbase chassis from the Alter II. It featured a 40 mm armoured glass box on the rear with a chair for the Pope. It had air conditioning and outside loudspeakers connected to a microphone in the rear. Originally it had the 2.5 litre turbocharged engine, but due to safety impositions the normal 2.5 litre  diesel engine was fitted.

An updated version was announced in 2000, powered by a 2.1 L turbodiesel engine. This engine was less noisy and had more torque at low speed. Several options were available, including air conditioning and GPS. Price was meant to be lower than a Land Rover Defender with similar finishings. However, the company had no capital to invest in its development.

Vehicle Models

 UMM Cournil 490 2100 Diesel 4X4 (1977–1985)
  UMM Cournil Pickup Truck 2500 4X4 (1970s and 1980s)
  UMM Cournil Hiker 4WD (1970s and 1980s For Export Only)
  UMM Cournil Dakary 4WD (1970s and 1980s For Export Only)
  UMM Cournil Transcat 4WD 2500 (1970s and 1980s For Export Only)
 UMM 4x4 Cournil 494 2300 Diesel 4X4 (1979–1986)   
  UMM Alter 4X4 Petrol 2000 (1980s and 1990s)
 UMM Alter 4X4 2500 Diesel (1985-1987)  
 UMM Alter TD 4X4 2500 (1980s and 1990s)
 UMM Alter TDI 4WD 2500 (1987-1996 110 bhp) 
 UMM Alter Crewcab Pickup Truck 4X4 Diesel (1980s 1990s 78 bhp)
 UMM Alter Pickup Truck 4X4 TDI (1980s 1990s 110 bhp)
 UMM Trofeu 2000 Petrol (1980s and 1990s 150 bhp)
 UMM Trofeu PRV V6 2700 (1980s and 1990s 180 bhp mainly For Racing)
 UMM Alvor Cabriolet 2000 Petrol (100 bhp 1980s and 1990s) 
  UMM Alvor Cabriolet 2500 Diesel (78 bhp 1980s and 1990s)
 UMM Alter II Turbo Diesel 2500 (110 bhp 1986–1994)
 UMM Alter 2000 CRDI 2500 4WD (2000–2004)

Notable Versions

 UMM Alter “Papamobile”
 UMM Alter A4 11 - to be called Alter III, only three prototypes were made, with only one road legal

Trivia

 The UMM Alter is named after a well-known Portuguese horse breed.
 Most of the known Portuguese off-road drivers started their careers driving UMMs, one of them is Carlos Sousa. Another one was the well-known José Megre a former racing driver who owned several and raced different UMM 4WD vehicles during his former racing career. Himself was also one of three business partners who started the PORTARO brandname.

See also

 Cournil
 Auverland
 Portaro
 Paris-Dakar Rally
 Heuliez
 José Megre

External links

 UMM's Official Website
 UMM's Unofficial Portuguese Community Forum
 UMM's Unofficial Portuguese Club
 UMM's Unofficial French Site
 UK UMM forum

Car manufacturers of Portugal
Vehicle manufacturing companies established in 1977
Portuguese companies established in 1977
Companies based in Lisbon